CSS Rappahannock, a steam sloop-of-war, was built at the Blackwall Yard on the River Thames by Money Wigram & Son in 1855 as an  for the Royal Navy and named HMS Victor. Although a handsomely modeled vessel, numerous defects occasioned her sale in 1863. An agent of the Confederate States Government purchased her ostensibly for the China trade, but British authorities suspected she was destined to be a Confederate commerce raider and ordered her detention. Nevertheless, she succeeded in escaping from Sheerness, England, on November 24, with workmen still on board and only a token crew. Her Confederate States Navy officers joined in the English Channel.

When he bought her from the Admiralty through his secret agent on November 14, Commander Matthew F. Maury had intended Rappahannock to replace the cruiser  and was about to transfer Georgias guns to her. She was ideal for a cruiser — wooden-hulled and bark-rigged with two engines and a lifting screw propeller.

She was commissioned a Confederate man-of-war underway, but while passing out of the Thames Estuary her bearings burned out and she had to be taken across to Calais for repairs. There Lieutenant C. M. Fauntleroy, CSN, was placed in command. Detained on various pretexts by the French Government, Rappahannock never got to sea and was turned over to the United States at the close of the war.

References

Cruisers of the Confederate States Navy
Ships built by the Blackwall Yard
Ships built on the River Thames
1857 ships
Victor